Esko Emil Töyri (until 1935 Törnroos; 6 October 1915 – 4 November 1992) was a Finnish film cinematographer and director. During his career, he won three Jussi Awards for best cinematography; in 1949 for films Vain kaksi tuntia and Hornankoski, in 1950 for films Katupeilin takana, Rosvo Roope and Hallin Janne, and in 1953 for Noita palaa elämään.

Selected filmography as a cinematographer 

Sellaisena kuin sinä minut halusit (1944)
Houkutuslintu (1946)
Pikajuna pohjoiseen (1947)
Rosvo Roope (1949)
Putkinotko (1954)
Lain mukaan (1956)
Kultainen vasikka (1961)
Tähdet kertovat, komisario Palmu (1962)
Hopeaa rajan takaa (1963)

References

External links 
 

1915 births
1992 deaths
Artists from Helsinki
People from Uusimaa Province (Grand Duchy of Finland)
Finnish film directors
Finnish cinematographers